Daniella Cicarelli Lemos (born 6 November 1978) is a Brazilian former model and TV show hostess for MTV Brasil's Beija Sapo. She was engaged to Brazilian footballer Ronaldo for three months in 2005.

Biography
Cicarelli was born in Belo Horizonte, daughter of Yara Cicarelli and Antonio de Padua Lemos. She is a descendant of Italian immigrants.

As a model, Daniela started her profession when she was about 20 years old, in parallel to the Business Administration course in the city of Belo Horizonte. She only took on the modeling career after moving to São Paulo. Later graduating in Law at the FMU.

Career
In January 2001, Cicarelli became nationally known in Brazil when she starred in a Pepsi commercial. She then played the character Larissa in the soap opera As Filhas da Mãe, by Silvio de Abreu, as a pair of actor Reynaldo Gianecchini.

Controversies

YouTube controversy
In September 2006, a video of Cicarelli having sex with her boyfriend on a beach in Tarifa, Spain was shot by paparazzo Miguel Temprano and broadcast on the TV show Dolce Vita on the Spanish station Telecinco. The video was spread around the internet, with Cicarelli being granted legal injunctions against YouTube and other websites, leading to several Brazilian ISPs blocking YouTube. In January 2007 after a legal decision, YouTube was blocked in Brazil for two days, resulting in 5.7 million users being blocked. This decision was criticized by internet watch groups for being an extremely selfish act. This happened when Cicarelli worked as a host on MTV Brasil, leading to nearly 80,000 emails protesting against the blockade and her legal actions. Some people even went to the building of the TV station to protest.

In 2007, YouTube won the case, based on that there is no expectation of privacy on a public beach. Cicarelli appealed and in 2008 the Supreme Court of the state of São Paulo changed the decision, on grounds of lack of public interest and invasion of privacy. The lawsuit was finally determined in 2015, when Cicarelli and her boyfriend in the video were each awarded damages of R$250,000 (US$64,000) from Google by the Superior Court of Justice of Brazil. YouTube remains active in Brazil.

Filmography

As a presenter

As an actress

Participation

References

External links

 
 

Living people
People from Belo Horizonte
Brazilian people of Italian descent
Brazilian female models
Brazilian television talk show hosts
Brazilian television presenters
VJs (media personalities)
Association footballers' wives and girlfriends
Brazilian women television presenters
Television controversies in Brazil
Sex scandals
1978 births